Adam Gino Bernero (born November 28, 1976) is a retired Major League Baseball (MLB) pitcher. Bernero has pitched for the Detroit Tigers, Colorado Rockies, Atlanta Braves, Philadelphia Phillies and Kansas City Royals.

Bernero signed with the Detroit Tigers in 1999 immediately after his final collegiate game with Armstrong Atlantic State University. Tigers scout Jeff Wetherby followed Bernero to a restaurant to sign him. Because he forgot to bring a contract, and because the Atlanta Braves were also interested in Bernero, Wetherby wrote out a contract for Bernero on a napkin which Bernero signed. Bernero was a member of the Tigers until 2003 before being traded in mid-season to the Colorado Rockies, at which point the Tigers had won a single game and lost 12, and Bernero with an ERA of 6.08.

Bernero signed with the Boston Red Sox for the 2007 season but missed the entire season after undergoing Tommy John surgery on March 1, 2007. In January 2008, he signed a minor league contract with the Pittsburgh Pirates. He became a free agent after the season.

References

External links

Adam Bernero at Baseball Almanac

1976 births
Living people
Baseball players from California
Major League Baseball pitchers
Detroit Tigers players
Colorado Rockies players
Atlanta Braves players
Armstrong State Pirates baseball players
Sacramento City Panthers baseball players
Philadelphia Phillies players
Kansas City Royals players
West Michigan Whitecaps players
Jacksonville Suns players
Toledo Mud Hens players
Tulsa Drillers players
Colorado Springs Sky Sox players
Richmond Braves players
Scranton/Wilkes-Barre Red Barons players
Omaha Royals players
Indianapolis Indians players